Silver Top is a 1938 British crime film directed by George King and starring Marie Wright, Betty Ann Davies, David Farrar and Marjorie Taylor. It was made at Shepperton Studios as a quota quickie.

Synopsis
A gang of criminals decide to swindle an elderly sweet shop owner living in a country village out of her money by producing her "long-lost son" who is really one of their gang. However, once he takes up his disguise he begins to become entranced with the quiet country village and falls in love with the Vicar's daughter. He ends up refusing to help his former criminal associates and reveals his true identity to the villagers.

Cast
 Marie Wright as Mrs Deeping 
 Betty Ann Davies as Dushka Vernon 
 Marjorie Taylor as Hazel Summers 
 David Farrar as Babe 
 Brian Buchel as Flash Gerald 
 Bryan Herbert as Jem Withers 
 Polly Emery as Martha Bains 
 Isobel Scaife as Aggie Murbles

References

Bibliography
 Chibnall, Steve. Quota Quickies: The Birth of the British 'B' Film. British Film Institute, 2007.
 Shafer, Stephen C. British Popular Films, 1929-1939: The Cinema of Reassurance. Routledge, 1997.

External links

1938 films
Films directed by George King
1938 crime films
British crime films
Films shot at Shepperton Studios
Films set in England
Quota quickies
British black-and-white films
1930s English-language films
1930s British films